This is a list of episodes from the CBS television comedy The Andy Griffith Show. The first episode aired on October 3, 1960, and the final episode aired on April 1, 1968. There were 249 episodes in all, 159 in black and white (seasons 1–5) and 90 in color (seasons 6–8). The backdoor pilot for the series was an episode of The Danny Thomas Show, "Danny Meets Andy Griffith", which first aired on February 15, 1960.

Series overview

Pilot (1960)

"No. in series" and "No. in season" for the pilot dictate the airing and location of the episode within the parent series.

Episodes in black and white (1960–1965)

Season 1 (1960–61)
All episodes in black and white

Season 2 (1961–62)
All episodes in black and white

Season 3 (1962–63)
All episodes in black and white

Season 4 (1963–64)
All episodes in black and white. The DVD and iTunes releases and streaming services follow the originally intended broadcast order and list A Date for Gomer as episode 9 and Up in Barney's Room as episode 10.

Season 5 (1964–65)
 This is the last season with Barney Fife as a regular character.  It is also the final season to be shot in black and white.
 In the season's final episode, a mention is made of Haymore and Rockford Streets, which was near the actual location of Andy Griffith's home as a child.

Episodes in color (1965–1968)

Season 6 (1965–66)
At the beginning of this season, The Andy Griffith Show went from black and white to color, beginning with the episode "Opie's Job".  All subsequent episodes in Seasons 6, 7 and 8 were filmed in color.
The CBS in Color logo was introduced at the start of this season.
Don Knotts has left the series as a main character, making guest appearances following the end of Season 5.

Season 7 (1966–67)

Season 8 (1967–68)

Reunion movie

Note

  'David Adler' was a pseudonym for blacklisted writer Frank Tarloff.

References

Andy Griffith Show
The Andy Griffith Show